The Condon Hills are a group of hills rising to  along the east side of Rayner Glacier, Enderby Land. They were plotted from air photos taken by Australian National Antarctic Research Expeditions in 1956 and 1957, and named by the Antarctic Names Committee of Australia for M.A. Condon, Assistant Director, Bureau of Mineral Resources, Canberra, Australia.

See also
Mount Lira, located 5 nautical miles (9 km) east of the Condon Hills

References
 

Hills of Antarctica
Landforms of Enderby Land